In astrophysics and cosmology scalar field dark matter is a classical, minimally coupled, scalar field postulated to account for the inferred dark matter.

Background
The universe may be accelerating, fueled perhaps by a cosmological constant or some
other field possessing long range ‘repulsive’ effects. A model must predict the correct form for
the large scale clustering spectrum, account for cosmic microwave background anisotropies on large and intermediate angular scales, and provide agreement with the luminosity distance relation obtained from observations of high redshift supernovae. The modeled evolution of the universe includes a large amount of unknown matter and energy in order to agree with such observations. This energy density has two components: cold dark matter and dark energy. Each contributes to the theory of the origination of galaxies and the expansion of the universe. The universe must have a critical density, a density not explained by  baryonic matter (ordinary matter) alone.

Scalar field
The dark matter can be modeled as a scalar field using two fitted parameters, mass and self-interaction. In this picture the dark matter consists of an ultralight particle with a mass of ~10−22 eV when there is no self-interaction. If there is a self-interaction a wider mass range is allowed. The uncertainty in position of a particle is larger than its Compton wavelength (a particle with mass 10−22 eV has a Compton wavelength of 1.3 light years), and for some reasonable estimates of particle mass and density of dark matter there is no point talking about the individual particles’ positions and momenta. Ultra-light dark matter would be more like a wave than a particle, and the galactic halos are giant systems of condensed bose liquid, possibly superfluid. The dark matter can be described as a Bose–Einstein condensate of the ultralight quanta of the field and as boson stars. The enormous Compton wavelength of these particles prevents structure formation on small, subgalactic scales, which is a major problem in traditional cold dark matter models. The collapse of initial over-densities is studied in the references.

This dark matter model is also known as BEC dark matter or wave dark matter. Fuzzy dark matter and ultra-light axion are examples of scalar field dark matter.

See also

References

External links
 Scaled-Up Darkness, Scientific American

Physical cosmology
Astroparticle physics
Dark matter
Particle physics